Amy Hill is an actress.

Amy Hill may also refer to:

Amy Hill (cyclist), Welsh racing cyclist
Amy Hill, cover artist on It (novel)

See also
Amy Hill Hearth, author